The Tongbai Pumped Storage Power Station is a pumped-storage hydroelectric power station located  north of Tiantai city in Tiantai County of Zhejiang Province, China. Construction on the power station began in May 2000 and the first unit was commissioned in December 2005. The remaining three were operational by December 2006. The entire project cost US$904.10 million, of which US$320 million was provided by the World Bank. The power station operates by shifting water between an upper and lower reservoir to generate electricity. The lower reservoir was formed with the creation of the Tongbai Lower Dam on the Baizhang River. The Tongbai Upper Reservoir, which already existed before construction began, is in an adjacent valley above the east side of the lower reservoir on Tongbai Creek. During periods of low energy demand, such as at night, water is pumped from Tongbai Lower Reservoir up to the upper reservoir. When energy demand is high, the water is released back down to the lower reservoir but the pump turbines that pumped the water up now reverse mode and serve as generators to produce electricity. The process is repeated as necessary and the plant serves as a peaking power plant. The power station is operated by Shenergy Company.

Water from the upper reservoir is sent to the 1,200 MW underground power station near the lower reservoir through headrace/penstock pipes.

See also

List of pumped-storage power stations

References

Dams completed in 2005
Energy infrastructure completed in 2006
Dams in China
Pumped-storage hydroelectric power stations in China
Concrete-face rock-fill dams
2006 establishments in China
Rock-filled dams
Hydroelectric power stations in Zhejiang
Underground power stations